The Madison / St. Clair Record, also called The Record and formerly called The Madison County Record, is a weekly legal journal covering the Madison and St. Clair County Civil Courts in the state of Illinois As of 2011, it is located at 301 N. Main Street, Edwardsville, Illinois, with a staff consisting of publisher Brian Timpone, editor Ann Knef, senior writer Bethany Krajelis, office manager, Stacey Strojny and courts reporter Christina Stueve.

The Record was started by Timpone in September 2004 with The Madison County Record, a legal journal for Madison County, Illinois. It was silently funded by the United States Chamber of Commerce's Institute for Legal Reform to oppose lawsuits against businesses and to support tort reform. The Chamber later funded a site run by The Record called Legal Newsline.

References

External links
 

Newspapers published in Illinois